The 2011-12 season marks the second season of Olympique de Médéa in the second division of Algerian football.

Coaching staff

 note : HANNOUN Mohamed –Secrétaire

First team

Transfers

In

 Total spending:  ~ ?

Out

 Total income:  ~ ?

Statistics

Appearances, goals and cards
Last updated on 28 April 2012. 	
(Substitute appearances in brackets)

 need to add yellow/reds cards against USB

Captains
Accounts for all competitions.

Starting XI
Last updated on 2 November 2011.

Competitions

Pre-season

League

Algerian Cup

Matches

Pre-season

League

Algerian Cup

References

Olympique de Médéa seasons
O Medea